Don Rusnak (born October 5, 1975) is a Canadian politician who served as the Member of Parliament (MP) for the riding of Thunder Bay—Rainy River in the House of Commons of Canada from 2015 to 2019 as a member of the Liberal Party of Canada.

Biography
Born and raised in Northwestern Ontario, Rusnak has deep roots in Thunder Bay–Rainy River, and as the son of Ukrainian and Anishinaabe (Ojibway) parents.

Education
Rusnak studied Political Science and Integrated Forest Resource Management at Lakehead University. In 2001, Rusnak attended the University of Manitoba, Robson Hall Faculty of Law, and during his final year, attended Osgoode Hall Law School to study in the Intensive Program in Aboriginal Lands, Resources and Governments.

Career prior to election
Rusnak has extensive professional experience drawing from his work in the forestry industry, public sector, and from his own legal practice. While working with Manitoba Health, Rusnak helped to improve the delivery of healthcare services for Northern Manitobans, and as a Crown Prosecutor in Eastern Alberta, he prosecuted criminal and regulatory offences. Rusnak served as the interim Executive Director for Grand Council Treaty No. 3 in Kenora.

Rusnak has volunteered his time with many organizations, such as the Ontario Justice Education Network and the Martin Aboriginal Education Initiative – a group which improves elementary and secondary school education outcomes for Aboriginal Canadians through the implementation of specific programs and the application of appropriate research.

Federal politics

Rusnak was elected to represent the riding of Thunder Bay—Rainy River 2015 federal election, defeating incumbent MP John Rafferty. He was the only First Nation MP elected in the province of Ontario.

In September 2017, Rusnak was appointed as parliamentary secretary to the Minister of Indigenous Services. He stepped down from this role in August 2018, citing family concerns.

In November 2018, Rusnak was acclaimed as the Liberal candidate to run in the 2019 federal election. However, he later decided not to run for re-election.

Political roles
Standing Committee on Indigenous and Northern Affairs
Standing Joint Committee of the Library of Parliament
Chair of the Indigenous Caucus
Director-at-Large Canada-Ukraine Parliamentary Friendship Group

Electoral record

References

Don Rusnak - Member of Parliament - Members of Parliament - House of Commons of Canada
Liberal Party of Canada

External links
 Liberal Party of Canada

Living people
1975 births
Liberal Party of Canada MPs
Canadian people of Ukrainian descent
Ojibwe people
Members of the House of Commons of Canada from Ontario
Indigenous Members of the House of Commons of Canada
First Nations lawyers
First Nations politicians
Lawyers in Ontario
Politicians from Thunder Bay
Lakehead University alumni
University of Manitoba alumni
Osgoode Hall Law School alumni
Robson Hall alumni
21st-century Canadian politicians